Coal Creek is a ghost town near Fernie, British Columbia, Canada. During the 1950s, residents left the town due to the closure of a mine. Some parts of the town remain, but most have been overtaken by forest. On May 22, 1902, an explosion in a mine left 128 dead in one of the worst mining disasters in Canadian history.
Coal Creek, the town's namesake, is a tributary of the Elk River which it joins in Fernie, British Columbia.
Coal Creek Mountain is next to Castle Mountain near Fernie.

References
Mine Disasters

External links
Crowsnest.bc.ca Coal Creek
Coal in the Crowsnest

Ghost towns in British Columbia
Elk Valley (British Columbia)
Populated places in the Regional District of East Kootenay